Kay Fung Nga Kei (born 11 September 1988) is a Hongkonger footballer who plays as a forward for Hong Kong Women League club Citizen AA and the Hong Kong women's national team.

International career
Fung represented Hong Kong at three AFC Women's Asian Cup qualification editions (2008, 2010 and 2014), two AFC Women's Olympic Qualifying Tournament editions (2012 and 2020) and the 2018 Asian Games.

International goals

See also
List of Hong Kong women's international footballers

References

1988 births
Living people
Hong Kong women's footballers
Women's association football forwards
Hong Kong women's international footballers